Synodus mascarensis is a species of lizardfish family Synodontidae that is found in the highest concentrations in the Mascarene Ridge.

References

Synodontidae
Fish described in 2008